WDAN (1490 AM) is a radio station broadcasting a News/Talk format. Licensed to Danville, Illinois, United States.  The station is currently owned by Neuhoff Corp., through licensee Neuhoff Media Danville, LLC.

References

External links

DAN
News and talk radio stations in the United States